Following is a list of historic and current chapters of the Theta Xi (ΘΞ) fraternity.

Undergraduate chapters
Active chapters are indicated in bold. Inactive chapters are indicated in italic.

Notes

References

External links 
Theta Xi National Headquarters

Lists of chapters of United States student societies by society
chapters